Foraker is an unincorporated community in Hardin County, in the U.S. state of Ohio.

History
Foraker was originally called Oakland, and under the latter name was laid out in 1886. The present name is for Joseph B. Foraker, 37th Governor of Ohio. A post office called Foraker was established in 1883, and remained in operation until 1941.

References

Unincorporated communities in Hardin County, Ohio
1886 establishments in Ohio
Populated places established in 1886
Unincorporated communities in Ohio